The Deuel County Courthouse, located at 718 3rd St. in Chappell, Nebraska, is a 1915 brick Classical Revival courthouse designed by noted Denver architect John J. Huddart.  It was listed on the National Register of Historic Places in 1990.

It is a  rectangular building of the "County Citadel" type.

References

External links 

Courthouses on the National Register of Historic Places in Nebraska
Neoclassical architecture in Nebraska
Government buildings completed in 1915
Buildings and structures in Deuel County, Nebraska
County courthouses in Nebraska
National Register of Historic Places in Deuel County, Nebraska